Harvey Jerai Grant (born January 10, 1989) is an American professional basketball player for BC Budivelnyk of the European North Basketball League and the Champions League. He played college basketball for Clemson University.

College career
In his four-year career at Clemson, Grant played 127 games (63 starts) while averaging 6.7 points, 4.3 rebounds and 1.6 blocks in 17.9 minutes per game. As a senior in 2010–11, he was named to the ACC All-Defensive team and earned honorable mention All-ACC honors.

Professional career

Sydney Kings
On August 9, 2011, Grant signed with the Sydney Kings for the 2011–12 NBL season. He earned player of the week honors for rounds 14 and 24. In 28 games for the Kings, he averaged 11.9 points, 8.1 rebounds and 1.1 assists per game.

Enel Brindisi
On July 7, 2012, Grant joined the Houston Rockets for the 2012 NBA Summer League. On July 23, he signed with Enel Brindisi of Italy for the 2012–13 season. In 30 games for Brindisi, he averaged 4.5 points and 3.4 rebounds per game.

Hapoel Holon and Ventspils
In July 2013, Grant signed with Hapoel Holon of Israel for the 2013–14 season. In November 2013, he left Hapoel and signed with HKK Široki of Bosnia for the rest of the season. He later left Široki before appearing in a game for them.

On December 13, 2013, he signed with BK Ventspils of Latvia for the rest of the season. In 22 league games for Ventspils, he averaged 11.7 points and 5.5 rebounds per game, helping the team win the 2013–14 league championship.

On July 28, 2014, Grant re-signed with BK Ventspils for the 2014–15 season. In 28 league games for Ventspils, he averaged 11.8 points, 6.3 rebounds and 1.0 assists per game.

Neptūnas Klaipėda
On July 25, 2015, Grant signed with Lithuanian team Neptūnas Klaipėda. He helped Neptūnas reach the LKL finals for the second time in club history, and helped the team have a very solid Eurocup Basketball campaign, reaching the Top16 phase. He averaged 9.6 points and 6.0 rebounds per game in the LKL, and 8.9 points and 6.2 rebounds in the EuroCup.

On July 10, 2016, Grant re-signed with Neptūnas Klaipėda. He averaged 8.8 points and 5.6 rebounds in the LKL.

Orasi Ravenna Basket and Trotamundos de Carabobo
On August 21, 2017, Grant signed with Orasi Ravenna Basket of Italian Serie A2 Basket.

On May 13, 2018, he signed with Trotamundos de Carabobo of Venezuelan Liga Profesional de Baloncesto.

Return to Neptūnas Klaipėda
On July 19, 2018, Grant returned to Neptūnas Klaipėda.

SIG Strasbourg
On June 1, 2019, Grant signed with SIG Strasbourg of the French LNB Pro A.

AEK Athens
On December 27, 2019, Grant officially signed with Greek club AEK Athens for the rest of the 2019–20 season.

Maccabi Haifa
On May 24, 2020, Grant signed with Maccabi Haifa of the Israeli league.

Manama
On August 12, 2020, Grant signed with Manama Club in Bahrain.

Promitheas Patras
On December 23, 2020, Grant signed with Promitheas Patras of the Greek Basket League and the EuroCup. He averaged 11.6 points, 5.4 rebounds and 0.8 blocks per game. On July 26, 2021, Grant renewed his contract with the Greek club. In 33 league games, he averaged 10.4 points, 4.9 rebounds, 1.2 assists and 0.6 blocks, playing around 20 minutes per contest.

BC Budivelnyk
On August 7, 2022, he has signed with BC Budivelnyk of the European North Basketball League.

Personal life
Grant is the son of Harvey and Beverly Grant, and has three brothers: Jerami, Jerian and Jaelin. Harvey played college basketball at Clemson and Oklahoma, and was the 12th overall pick in the 1988 NBA draft, going on to play for 11 years in the NBA with Washington (Bullets and Wizards), Portland and Philadelphia. Grant's uncle, Horace (twin brother of Harvey), played college basketball at Clemson and was a four-time NBA champion with Chicago and Los Angeles.

Grant and his partner, Jessica, have a daughter named Halle. Grant proposed to his girlfriend during one of Neptūnas home games in 2016.

References

External links
 Jerai Grant at legabasket.it

1989 births
Living people
American expatriate basketball people in Australia
American expatriate basketball people in France
American expatriate basketball people in Greece
American expatriate basketball people in Israel
American expatriate basketball people in Italy
American expatriate basketball people in Latvia
American expatriate basketball people in Lithuania
American men's basketball players
Basketball players from Maryland
BC Budivelnyk players
BC Neptūnas players
BK Ventspils players
Centers (basketball)
Clemson Tigers men's basketball players
DeMatha Catholic High School alumni
Hapoel Holon players
New Basket Brindisi players
People from Bowie, Maryland
Power forwards (basketball)
Promitheas Patras B.C. players
SIG Basket players
Sportspeople from the Washington metropolitan area
Sydney Kings players
Trotamundos B.B.C. players
Manama Club basketball players